Henry Salvatori (March 28, 1901 – July 6, 1997) was an American geophysicist, businessman, philanthropist, and political activist.

Salvatori founded Western Geophysical in 1933 and, after selling the company in 1960, pursued a second career as a philanthropist and conservative political activist. He was a long-time financial supporter of the Heritage Foundation and the Claremont Institute, both conservative think tanks.

Background and business career
Salvatori was born in Tocco da Casauria, Abruzzo, Italy, and emigrated with his family to the United States in 1908.

He earned a bachelor's degree from the University of Pennsylvania in 1923 and a master's degree in physics from Columbia University in 1926. In 1930, he joined Geophysical Service Incorporated, but he left in 1933 to found Western Geophysical.  
Western Geophysical prospered, allowing him to begin a long involvement in philanthropy and conservative political causes. In 1960, he sold Western Geophysical to Litton Industries, allowing him to devote more time to politics.

Philanthropy and activism
Having already been a founding stockholder of National Review magazine in the 1950s, Salvatori pursued a second career as a philanthropist and conservative political activist after selling Western Geophysical in 1960.

In 1962, he convinced the staunchly conservative Joe Shell, Richard M. Nixon's intraparty rival for governor, to endorse Nixon in the general election to promote party unity. Nixon, however, lost to the Democrat Edmund G. "Pat" Brown, Sr. In 1964, Salvatori chaired Barry Goldwater's presidential campaign in California. He convinced Goldwater to allow Ronald Reagan to give a televised fundraising speech entitled "A Time for Choosing", the speech that launched Reagan's political career.

Later, he was one of Reagan's initial supporters for governor of California, having served as state finance chairman for his 1966 campaign and as part of Reagan's "kitchen cabinet". Salvatori was the campaign director for Sam Yorty during Yorty's 1969 mayoral primary campaign against Tom Bradley.

Salvatori and his wife, the former Grace Ford, also made significant contributions to civic and educational institutions, including the Dorothy Chandler Pavilion, Claremont McKenna College, the University of Southern California, the University of Pennsylvania, Stanford University, Pepperdine University, and Boston University. 

In 1969, Salvatori founded The Henry Salvatori Center for the Study of Individual Freedom in the Modern World at Claremont McKenna College. In 1990 he established the Henry Salvatori Foundation, which has, among other acts, endowed a chair (the Henry Salvatori Professorship in American Values and Traditions) at Chapman University. another chair (the "Henry Salvatori Professorship in Law & Community Service") at Chapman University School of Law, currently held by John Eastman. and endowed, in 1996, the Salvatori Prize for American Citizenship, awarded annually by the Heritage Foundation.

Recognition
Salvatori was honoured by the Young America's Foundation, which created the Henry Salvatori Lecture Series in 1991.

Extended family
Salvatori's grandson Ford O'Connell is a Republican political activist, analyst, pundit and writer.

References

External links
 USC News: Trustee Henry Salvatori Dies at 96
 L.A. Times: Henry Salvatori, GOP Kingmaker, Dies – Oil company founder was contributor to Republicans, confidant to three presidents.
 N.Y. Times: Henry Salvatori, G.O.P. Adviser And Oil Company Founder, 96
, libertyhaven.com. Retrieved April 27, 2014
Salvatori profile, SEG Virtual Museum. Retrieved April 27, 2014.  
Salvatori bio, Claremont-McKenna College website. Retrieved April 27, 2014

1901 births
1997 deaths
People from the Province of Pescara
American political activists
Businesspeople from California
California Republicans
The Heritage Foundation
American people of Italian descent
People from Greater Los Angeles
Place of death missing
20th-century American businesspeople
Activists from California
20th-century American philanthropists
Italian emigrants to the United States